Silvermannen (lit. "The Silver Man") is a 1996 Swedish mini series in 3 episodes directed by Ulf Malmros and starring Kjell Bergqvist.

Plot summary 
A man, missing since 5 years, turns up in the town Bläcksjön with no memory of who he is. He is unable to identify with his former life and instead becomes obsessed with mediating in a town feud during a nationwide energy crisis.

Cast 
 Kjell Bergqvist as Silvermannen
 Gert Fylking as Roy
 Per Graffman as Holmgren
 Sara Key as Eva
 Carl Kjellgren as Conny
 Camilla Lundén as Kajsa
 Anneli Martini as Henrietta
 Jacob Nordenson
 Margareta Pettersson
 Jacqueline Ramel as Mona
 Thomas Ravelli as himself
 Vanna Rosenberg as Kristina
 Göran Thorell as Maans
 Anna Westerberg

References

External links 
Entry on IMDb

Swedish television miniseries
1996 Swedish television series debuts
Swedish drama television series
1990s Swedish television series